Kyurdalilyar (also, Kyurd-Alilar and Kyurdalylar) is a village in the Goygol Rayon of Azerbaijan.

References 

Populated places in Goygol District